Flat Rock Community Schools is a school district jurisdiction located in the city of Flat Rock, in Wayne County, Michigan.

Vision Statement

Flat Rock Community Schools will provide the programs necessary to develop the appropriate degree of academic proficiency, emotional development, social awareness and character for all students to become innovators and leaders in a competitive global society.

Mission Statement

The Mission of the Flat Rock Community Schools is to provide quality educational programs, resources and the collaboration of support services for all community members, enabling them to be competent, informed and involved citizens in an ever-changing society.

Flat Rock Community Schools Administration
28639 Division St.
Flat Rock, Michigan 48134
Built: Around 1950

Flat Rock Community High School
25600 Seneca St.
Flat Rock, Michigan 48134
Built: 2000

Thomas Simpson Middle School
24900 Meadows
Flat Rock, Michigan 48134
Built: 1968

John M. Barnes Elementary School
24925 Meadows 
Flat Rock, Michigan 48134
Built: Around 1960

Ethel Bobcean Elementary School
28300 Evergreen
Flat Rock, Michigan 48134
Built: 1957

External links
Flat Rock Community Schools website

School districts in Michigan
Education in Monroe County, Michigan
Education in Wayne County, Michigan